Jafarabad-e Sofla may refer to:
 Jafarabad-e Sofla, Fars
 Jafarabad-e Sofla, Lorestan
 Jafarabad-e Sofla, North Khorasan